The 1955 International cricket season was from April 1955 to August 1955.

Season overview

June

South Africa in England

August

Denmark in Netherlands

References

1955 in cricket